Highway 175 (AR 175, Ark. 175, and Hwy. 175) is a state highway in Northeast Arkansas. The route begins at Highway 289 and runs north  to Wirth. The highway was created as a short highway west of Hardy on September 5, 1940, with several reroutings and extensions throughout the 1960s and 1970s. One former alignment change was designated Highway 175 Spur, a spur route in Cherokee Village, in 1980. Both routes are maintained by the Arkansas Department of Transportation (ArDOT).

Route description
Highway 175 begins at Highway 289 west of Cherokee Village in Northeast Arkansas. The route is the main east–west highway through the community, with a former alignment now known as Highway 175 Spur beginning near the center of town and running south. Cherokee Village is a planned retirement community by John A. Cooper, a forerunner to Bella Vista and Hot Springs Village, which also include a series of winding roads, cul-de-sacs, golf courses, and other retirement amenities.

Highway 175 intersects US Highway 62 (US 62) and US 412 shortly after entering Hardy, and a concurrency forms to the east through town. While passing through the city, US 62/US 412/AR 175 begin an overlap with US 63, which continues east until Highway 175 splits north from the concurrency.

Highway 175 runs north through a sparsely populated rural area toward Missouri. The highway runs northeasterly to the community of Sellers' Store before turning north along a section line road to terminate at Wirth. The roadway continues as Pleasant Run Road, with a gravel crossroad named Wirth Road.

Major intersections
Mile markers reset at some concurrencies.

|-
| colspan=5 align=center | See US 62/US 412
|-

Cherokee Village spur

Highway 175 Spur (AR 175, Ark. 175, Hwy. 175, and Iroquois Drive) is a  spur route in Cherokee Village. The route was created by the ASHC on April 9, 1980 from a former alignment of AR 175.

Route description
It runs past several parks and terminates at US 62 BUS and US 412 south of Cherokee Village.

Major intersections

See also

 List of state highways in Arkansas

Notes

References

External links

175
Transportation in Fulton County, Arkansas
Transportation in Stone County, Arkansas